Broken Hearts Club is the second studio album by American singer Syd. The album was released through Columbia Records on April 8, 2022.

Background 
Syd, a member of the grammy-nominated band The Internet, released her second solo album five years after the release of her debut solo album, Fin. Whilst Fin has been described as a 'confident' and self-assured album, Broken Hearts Club is more 'vulnerable' - inspired by contrasting experiences of love and heartbreak. Syd began work on the album in the midst of a relationship, and finished it after they broke up. The album follows a similar narrative pattern to her experience, starting with "CYBAH": a song about starting a new relationship, and ending with "Goodbye My Love": which looks back on an ended relationship as both parties move on. In an interview with NME, Syd talked about experiencing a creative period after she was diagnosed with depression and began to see a therapist, which enabled her to finish work on the album.

Syd, the former engineer for ex-band Odd Future, produced most of the record herself, collaborating on some songs with Rodney (Darkchild) Jerkins, bandmate Steve Lacy, and ForteBowie. Other collaboraters include Smino, Kehlani on "Out Loud", Nicky Davey, Brandon Shoop, Troy Taylor, G Koop and Lucky Daye on "CYBAH".

"Missing Out" was released as a single in February 2021, with "Fast Car" and "Right Track" coming out in July and September of the same year respectively. Syd said in a press conference for "Fast Car" that she 'wanted to make something for the gay Black girls'.

The album will be her last released by Columbia Records.

Release and reception 

Broken Hearts Club received positive reviews, with NME giving it four out of five stars and calling it 'arguably the R&B star's strongest project to date'. At Metacritic, which assigns a normalised rating out of 100 to reviews from mainstream publications, the album received an average score of 82, based on 10 critic reviews. Pitchfork gave the album a 7.5, saying that the album's more traditional sound than Fin, 'reaffirms her considerable versatility' and that the album is finished with 'artful finesse'. Rolling Stone gave the album four stars, arguing it was an 'epic tale of love and loss with lush production'. Independent music website The Quietus called the album 'terrific'. The Guardian, giving 3 stars, called the album a 'mixed bag', stating that Syd was stronger on tracks where she collaborated with other artists. Okayplayer included the album on their '22 Best Albums of 2022' list.

Track listing 
Broken Hearts Club

References 

Syd albums
Columbia Records albums